Let's Dance is a Swedish dance competition featuring Swedish celebrities. It is a national version of Strictly Come Dancing. The series has been broadcast for sixteen seasons on TV4. Hosts since 2021 are David Lindgren and Petra Mede.

Presenters
Key
 Presenter of Let's Dance

Judging panel
Key
 Main judge

Main series results

References

External links 
 
 

 
TV4 (Sweden) original programming
Swedish reality television series
Swedish music television series
2006 Swedish television series debuts
Swedish television series based on British television series